Bala Şürük (also, Bala-Şürük, Bala Shuryuk, and Malyy Shuryuk) is a village and municipality in the Lankaran Rayon of Azerbaijan. It has a population of 1,476. The municipality consists of the villages of Bala Şürük and Kosalar.

References 

Populated places in Lankaran District